The 1975–76 Liga Bet season was the last in which Liga Bet was the third tier of Israeli football, as at the end of the season, Liga Artzit came into existence, and became the new second tier, Liga Alef became the third tier, and Liga Bet became the fourth tier.

As no club relegated from Liga Alef in the previous season, each Liga Bet division had 15 clubs. due to the restructuring, two clubs promoted from each division; winners, Hapoel Beit She'an, Hapoel Nazareth Illit, Hapoel Or Yehuda and Maccabi Yavne, who joined by second placed clubs, Hapoel Afikim, Hapoel Ra'anana, Hapoel Rosh HaAyin and Hapoel Ashkelon.

North Division A

Hapoel Kfar Ruppin folded. as a result, the spare place in the division was filled by promoting extra club from Liga Gimel.

North Division B

South Division A

South Division B

References
Verdict in the South - in last matchday Davar, 17.5.76, Historical Jewish Press 
Bet Leagues Davar, 23.5.76, Historical Jewish Press 

Liga Bet seasons
Israel
3